KLPZ (1380 AM) is a radio station licensed to serve Parker, Arizona, United States. The station is owned by Keith Douglas Learn, through licensee Learn Broadcasting Corporation. It airs a country music format.

The station was assigned the KLPZ call letters (which come from La Paz County, of which Parker is the seat) by the Federal Communications Commission on March 6, 1984.

References

External links
 KLPZ official website

LPZ
Country radio stations in the United States
La Paz County, Arizona
Radio stations established in 1984
1984 establishments in Arizona